A Thousand Winding Roads is the debut studio album by American country music artist Joe Diffie. The album's title is derived from a line in its lead-off single "Home", which reached #1 on the Billboard Hot Country Singles & Tracks (now Hot Country Songs) charts in late 1990. Other singles from this album include "If You Want Me To" (#2) "If the Devil Danced (In Empty Pockets)" (#1), and "New Way (To Light Up an Old Flame)" (#2). "There Goes The Neighborhood" would later be recorded by Shania Twain on her debut album and "Stranger in Your Eyes" would later be recorded by Ken Mellons on his 1995 album, Where Forever Begins.

Track listing

Personnel
Mike Chapman – bass guitar
Walt Cunningham – synthesizer
Joe Diffie – lead vocals, background vocals
Paul Franklin – steel guitar, pedabro
Rob Hajacos – fiddle
Bill Hullett – acoustic guitar
Brent Mason – electric guitar
Tim Mensy – electric guitar
Johnny Neel – background vocals
Ron Oates – keyboards
Dave Pomeroy – bass guitar
Matt Rollings – keyboards
Mike Severs – mandolin, acoustic guitar
Lonnie Wilson – drums, background vocals

Charts

Weekly charts

Year-end charts

References

 
Liner notes to A Thousand Winding Roads, Epic Records, 1990

1990 debut albums
Joe Diffie albums
Epic Records albums
Albums produced by Bob Montgomery (songwriter)